Ele is Finnish producer Sasu Ripatti's debut full-length album as Vladislav Delay. It was released in 1999 on the Australian label Sigma Editions.

The tracks on Ele average over twenty minutes in length.  Two of the tracks, "Kohde" and the title track, were reworked in shorter versions on Delay's second album Entain.

Reception
Allmusic gave it three stars, comparing his music to that of Steve Reich, Oval, Thomas Brinkmann, and Pole and calling it Delay's "defining point-of-departure in defining a new hybrid dub, minimalism, IDM, post-techno music."

Track listing
 "Pisa" (17:35)
 "Kohde" (30:28)
 "Ele" (17:04)

References 

1999 debut albums
Vladislav Delay albums